RC Obolon-University is a Ukrainian rugby club in Khmelnytskyi.

History
The club was founded in 1984.

External links
 RC Obolon-University on Ukrainian Rugby Portal

Rugby clubs established in 1984
Ukrainian rugby union teams
Sport in Khmelnytskyi, Ukraine